Rettenbach am Auerberg (Swabian: Reatebach) is a municipality in the district of Ostallgäu in Bavaria in Germany.

References

External links
 www.rettenbach-am-auerberg.de/

Ostallgäu